Onchidoris is a genus of dorid nudibranchs in the family Onchidorididae. One of its members is known to prey on barnacles and the others eat bryozoans. The radula contains a rachidian tooth when fully developed, but this is vestigial in some species.

Species 
Species within the genus Onchidoris include:
 Onchidoris aureopuncta (A. E. Verrill, 1901)
 Onchidoris bilamellata (Linnaeus, 1767) - type species
 Onchidoris derjugini (Volodchenko, 1941)
 Onchidoris diademata (Gould, 1870)
 Onchidoris grisea (Gould, 1870)
 Onchidoris hystricina (Bergh, 1878)
 Onchidoris lactea (A. E. Verrill, 1900)
 Onchidoris loveni (Alder & Hancock, 1862)
 Onchidoris macropompa Martynov, Korshunova, Sanamyan & Sanamyan, 2009
 Onchidoris maugeansis (Burn, 1958)
 Onchidoris miniata (A. E. Verrill, 1901)
 Onchidoris muricata (Müller O.F., 1776)
 Onchidoris olgae (Martynov, Korshunova, Sanamyan & Sanamyan, 2009)
 Onchidoris olivacea (A. E. Verrill, 1900)
 Onchidoris perlucea Ortea & Moro, 2014
 Onchidoris proxima (Alder & Hancock, 1854)
 Onchidoris quadrimaculata (A. E. Verrill, 1900)
 Onchidoris slavi (Martynov, Korshunova, Sanamyan & Sanamyan, 2009)
 Onchidoris sparsa (Alder & Hancock, 1846)
 Onchidoris tenella (Gould, 1870)
 Onchidoris tschuktschica (Krause, 1885)
Species brought into synonymy 
 Onchidoris albonigra (Pruvot-Fol, 1951): synonym of Knoutsodonta albonigra (Pruvot-Fol, 1951)
 Onchidoris aspera (Alder & Hancock, 1842): synonym of Onchidoris muricata (O. F. Müller, 1776)
 Onchidoris bouvieri (Vayssière, 1919): synonym of Knoutsodonta bouvieri (Vayssière, 1919)
 Onchidoris brasiliensis Alvim, Padula & Pimenta, 2011: synonym of Knoutsodonta brasiliensis (Alvim, Padula & Pimenta, 2011)
 Onchidoris cervinoi Ortea & Urgorri, 1979: synonym of Knoutsodonta cervinoi Ortea & Urgorri, 1979
 Onchidoris depressa (Alder & Hancock, 1842): synonym of Knoutsodonta depressa (Alder & Hancock, 1842)
 Onchidoris fusca (Müller O.F., 1776): synonym of Onchidoris bilamellata (Linnaeus, 1767)
 Onchidoris inconspicua (Alder & Hancock, 1851): synonym of Knoutsodonta inconspicua (Alder & Hancock, 1851)
 Onchidoris leachii Blainville, 1816 accepted as Onchidoris bilamellata (Linnaeus, 1767)
 Onchidoris luteocincta (M. Sars, 1870): synonym of  Diaphorodoris luteocincta (M. Sars, 1870)
 Onchidoris maugeansis (Burn, 1958): synonym of Knoutsodonta maugeansis (Burn, 1958)
 Onchidoris neapolitana (delle Chiaje, 1841): synonym of Knoutsodonta neapolitana (delle Chiaje, 1841)
 Onchidoris oblonga (Alder & Hancock, 1845): synonym of Knoutsodonta oblonga (Alder & Hancock, 1845)
 Onchidoris pusilla (Alder & Hancock, 1845): synonym of Knoutsodonta pusilla (Alder & Hancock, 1845)
 Onchidoris reticulata Ortea, 1979: synonym of Knoutsodonta reticulata Ortea, 1979
 Onchidoris sparsa (Alder & Hancock, 1846): synonym of Knoutsodonta sparsa (Alder & Hancock, 1846)
 Onchidoris tridactila Ortea & Ballesteros, 1982: synonym of Knoutsodonta tridactila Ortea & Ballesteros, 1982
 Onchidoris tuberculatus Hutton, 1873: synonym of Archidoris wellingtonensis (Abraham, 1877): synonym of Doris wellingtonensis Abraham, 1877

Taxonomy
Many authors prefer Onchidorus Blainville, 1816 as the valid name for the genus, changed to Onchidoris (Winckworth, 1932; Bouchet & Tardy, 1976; Thompson & Brown, 1976; Cattaneo & Barletta, 1984). According to Pruvot-Fol (1954) however this latter is a nomen nudum, while the elder synonym Villiersia is a nomen oblitum (see also Abbott, 1974). This is why Odhner (1907), Pruvot-Fol (1954), Swennen (1961) and Abbott (1974) are followed in the use of Lamellidoris Alder & Hancock, 1855.

References

External links 
 

Onchidorididae